Danling County is a county of central Sichuan Province, China. Danling, originally known as Qile Prefecture, was named after the gliding bird-shaped red edge of the Chiya Mountain (赤崖山) in the north of the Prefecture.

Climate

References

External links

County-level divisions of Sichuan
Meishan